Eugène Robert Poughéon  (18 July 1886 – 1 March 1955)  born in Paris, was a French artist, painter, illustrator and museum curator.

Biography 

Poughéon studied under Jean-Paul Laurens and Albert Besnard at the École des Beaux-Arts in Paris and later at the École des Arts Décoratifs with Charles Lameire.

In 1914 Poughéon won the Prix de Rome. In 1927, he was awarded the silver medal at the Paris Salon, and  two years later the gold medal. In 1935 he started teaching at the École des Beaux-Arts and at the Académie Julian. He was made director of the French Academy in Rome in 1942, and soon after became curator of the Musée Jacquemart-André.

Besides his paintings, murals, frescoes, and decors, Poughéon also illustrated books as well as providing artwork for banknotes.

See also 
 Art Deco

Bibliography 
 Alain Lesieutre, The Spirit and Splendour of Art Deco, Paddington Press 
 Norma, Bordeaux années 20-30: de Paris à l'Aquitaine, 2008

References

External links 
 Robert Poughéon on Artnet

20th-century French painters
20th-century French male artists
Currency designers
École des Beaux-Arts alumni
Academic staff of the Académie Julian
Academic staff of the École des Beaux-Arts
Members of the Académie des beaux-arts
Curators from Paris
1886 births
1955 deaths
19th-century French male artists